Larino railway station is the railway station that serves the municipality of Larino. Is situated in the centre of the city.

Note

Bibliography

External links

This article is based upon a translation of the Italian language version as at May 2017.

Railway stations in Molise